Raita is a side dish in Indian cuisine made of dahi (yogurt, often referred to as curd) together with raw or cooked vegetables, more seldom fruit, or in the case of boondi raita, with fried droplets of batter made from besan (chickpea flour, generally labeled as gram flour).

The closest approximation in western cuisine is a side dish or dip, or a cooked salad. It is often referred to as a condiment, but unlike traditional western condiments like pepper, mustard and horseradish that make dishes more spicy, a dish of dahi or raita has a cooling effect to contrast with spicy curries and kebabs that are the main fare of some Asian cuisines. In Indian cuisine, some type of flatbread may be eaten together with raita, chutneys and pickles.

The yogurt may be seasoned with coriander, roasted cumin seeds, mint, cayenne pepper, chaat masala and other herbs and spices.

Etymology
The word raita first appeared in print around the 19th century; it comes from the Hindi language. The word raita in Bengali language and Hindi is a portmanteau of the Sanskrit word rajika or the derivative Hindi rai (pronounced "ra-ee") meaning black mustard seed, and tiktaka, meaning sharp or pungent. 

In South India, especially Kerala and Tamil Nadu, traditional raita is called pachadi.

In Eastern Nepal, the dish is known as dahi kakro, whereas in western regions of Nepal it is known as raito.

Raita is also sometimes simply called dahi, or "sourmilk", after its main ingredient, particularly in South African Indian cuisine.

Preparation
Cumin and black mustard are fried.  This tempering is then mixed with minced, raw vegetables or fruits (such as cucumber, onion, carrot, pineapple, papaya) and yogurt.

Raw ginger and garlic paste, green chili paste, and sometimes mustard paste are used to enrich flavour. 

A variety of raita of India varies from region to region, most notable raithas are boondi raitha—tiny balls of fried gram flour (chickpea flour), which may taste salty or tīkhā (spicy) and onion raita and vegetable raita. The mixture is served chilled. Raita may cool the palate when eating spicy Indian dishes.

Variants
Raitas can be prepared with three main base ingredients: vegetables, pulses and fruits. These are mixed with yogurt and flavoured with a variety of seasonings to make different types of raita.

Vegetable raitas

 Bathua ka raita, popular in Haryana in winters
 Cucumber raita
 Lauki (bottle gourd/calabash) raita, popular in Haryana and Uttar Pradesh 
 Beetroot raita
 Brinjal raita
 Carrot raita
 Chili salt raita, could be chopped fresh chilies or just the dried chili powder
 Horned melon raita
 Mint and peanut raita
 Onion coriander spring onion raita
 Onion tomato raita
 Potato raita
 Pumpkin raita
 Spinach raita
 Garlic mint raita

Fruit raitas

 Banana raita
 Mango raita
 Guava raita
 Grape raita
 Pineapple raita
 Pomegranate raita
 Pear raita

Pulse raitas 
Made either from sprouted pulses, roasted pulses or other condiments made from pulse flour.
 Bhujia sev raita
 Boondi raita
 Sprouted green gram raita

Serving methods

As a side dish

Raita is served as a side dish to be eaten with main course dishes.

 Biryani
 Pulav (pilaf)
 Seekh kabab
 Paratha
 Pav bhaji
   Indian Thali

As a sauce (not traditional)  
 Grilled chicken
 Salmon
 Tacos

As a dressing (not traditional) 
 Salads
 Pasta salad

See also

 Tzatziki, a similar dish found in Eastern Mediterranean and Middle Eastern cuisine
 Pachadi, a South Indian pickle side dish similar to Raita
 Chukauni, a Nepalese potato side dish
 Lists
 List of condiments
 List of dips
 List of yogurt-based dishes and beverages

References

External links

Indian condiments
Uttar Pradeshi cuisine
Mughlai cuisine
Telangana cuisine
Bengali cuisine
Punjabi cuisine
Bihari cuisine
Yogurt-based dishes
Kerala cuisine